East West College of Natural Medicine (EWCNM) is an acupuncture, Chinese medicine, Complementary and Alternative Medicine, and massage school in Sarasota, Florida. It was founded in 1994. The school's campus is on two acres and includes a library, lounge, clinic, and herbal pharmacy. In 2012 the school was acquired by American Higher Education Development (AHED).

References

External links
Official website

Alternative medicine organizations